The following is a list of people from Pawnee County, Nebraska.  Inclusion on the list should be reserved for notable people from the present and past who have resided in the county.

 David Butler, first governor of Nebraska (1867–1871)
 Charles H. Corlett, major general in the U.S. Army who commanded troops in both the Pacific and European Theaters during World War II
 John H. Eastwood, US Army Air Corps chaplain, World War II
 William Alden Edson, scientist and engineer specializing in vacuum tube oscillators, radar, antennas and microwave technologies
 Lavon Heidemann, state Senator (District 1)
 Robert E. Holthus, Thoroughbred racehorse trainer
 Harold Lloyd, silent film actor
 William R. Lyman, football player
 Irish McCalla, actress
 Kenneth S. Wherry, U.S. Senator from Nebraska 1943–51; Senate Republican Leader
 Daniel Lawrence Whitney, comedian known as "Larry the Cable Guy"

Pawnee County